Rima San Giuseppe (Walser German: Arimmu or Ind Rimmu) is a frazione of Alto Sermenza in the Province of Vercelli in the Italian region Piedmont, located about  north of Turin and about  northwest of Vercelli.

References

Cities and towns in Piedmont